Christmastime! is an album by American singer-songwriter Don McLean, released in 2004. It is a complete collection of Don McLean's Christmas recordings and contains all of the songs previously released on Christmas and Christmas Dreams as well as two songs new to this collection.

Track listing 
"Winter Wonderland"
"O Little Town of Bethlehem"
"Blue Christmas"
"The Christmas Waltz"
"Santa Claus Is Comin' to Town"
"Toyland"
"Rudolph the Red-Nosed Reindeer"
"I'll Be Home for Christmas/Have Yourself a Merry Little Christmas"
"The Christmas Song (Chestnuts Roasting on an Open Fire)"
"White Christmas"
"Let It Snow! Let It Snow! Let It Snow!"
"Silent Night"
"Oh Holy Night"
"I Heard the Bells on Christmas Day"
"Go Tell It on the Mountain"
"God Rest Ye Merry Gentlemen"
"The Last Month of the Year"
"The Burgundian Carol"
"Little Child"
"It Came Upon a Midnight Clear"
"Pretty Paper"
"'Twas the Night before Christmas"

Christmas compilation albums
2004 Christmas albums
Christmas albums by American artists
2004 compilation albums
Don McLean compilation albums
Rock Christmas albums